Menhit  (also spelt Menchit) was originally a Nubian war goddess in ancient Egyptian religion. Her name depicts a warrior status, as it means (she who) massacres.

Due to the aggressive attributes possessed by and hunting methods used by lionesses, most things connected to warfare in Egypt were depicted as leonine, and Menhit was no exception, being depicted as a lioness-goddess.

She also was believed to advance ahead of the Egyptian armies and cut down their enemies with fiery arrows, similar to other war deities She was less known to the people as a crown goddess and was one of the goddesses who represented the protective uraeus on royal crowns.

In the 3rd Nome of Upper Egypt, particularly at Esna, Menhit was said to be the wife of Khnum and the mother of Heka. She was also known to be the mother of Shu.

She was also worshipped in Lower Egypt, where she was linked with the goddesses Wadjet and Neith.

She became identified with another lioness goddess, Sekhmet.

References

Literature
 Rolf Felde: Ägyptische Gottheiten. Wiesbaden 1995
 Hans Bonnet: Lexikon der ägyptischen Religionsgeschichte, Hamburg 2000; 

Egyptian goddesses
Nubian goddesses
War goddesses
Animal goddesses
Lion deities

ca:Llista de personatges de la mitologia egípcia#M